Andrew Jesus Barbosa (born November 18, 1987) is a Puerto Rican professional baseball pitcher who is a free agent. 

Barbosa attended Riverview High School in Riverview, Florida. The San Francisco Giants selected him in the 15th round of the 2006 MLB draft. He did not sign, and instead attended South Florida Community College. He transferred to the University of South Florida. He pitched for the Atlanta Braves, Arizona Diamondbacks, and New York Mets organizations. and signed with the Milwaukee Brewers after the 2016 season.
Barbosa was named as a reserve for the Puerto Rican national baseball team in the 2017 World Baseball Classic.

References

External links

Living people
1987 births
Puerto Rican baseball players
Baseball pitchers
Sportspeople from Sarasota, Florida
South Florida Bulls baseball players
Missoula Osprey players
South Bend Silver Hawks players
Visalia Rawhide players
Arizona League Diamondbacks players
Indios de Mayagüez players
Mobile BayBears players
Long Island Ducks players
Mississippi Braves players
Las Vegas 51s players
Binghamton Mets players
Gulf Coast Mets players
St. Lucie Mets players
2017 World Baseball Classic players
Colorado Springs Sky Sox players
Riverview High School (Riverview, Florida)